Sabit Damolla (June 1883 – 1934) was a Uyghur independence movement leader who led the Hotan rebellion against the Xinjiang Province government of Jin Shuren and later the Uyghur leader Khoja Niyaz. He is widely known as the first and only prime minister of the short-lived Islamic Republic of East Turkestan from November 12, 1933, until the republic's defeat in May 1934.

Life
Sabit Damolla Abdulbaqi was born in 1883, in county of Atush (Artux) in the Kashgar vilayet, where he received religious education. In the 1920s, he graduated from Xinjiang Academy of Politics and Laws in Ürümqi (later becoming Xinjiang University), that was founded by Governor Yang Zengxin in 1924 and originally performed courses in Russian, Chinese and Uyghur. After completing university, he visited the Middle East, touring Saudi Arabia, Turkey and Egypt; he also visited the Soviet Union, where he continued his studies. In 1932 he returned to Xinjiang through India, where he joined Emir Muhammad Amin Bughra in preparing a rebellion in Khotan district. Sabit Damulla was convinced that the Islamic world was not interested in supporting Uyghur independence, and so he turned to the Great Powers instead. Yang Zengxin had closed the publishing venture in Artush owned by Sabit Damulla. Sabit was a Jadidist.

Achievements
Between November 12, 1933, and April 6, 1934, he was selected the prime minister of the short-lived Turkish Islamic Republic of East Turkestan (TIRET) in Kashgar. While Sabit Damolla Abdulbaki favoured the co-official "Republic of Uyghurstan" moniker, Muhammad Amin Bughra opposed it, considering that to create a broad anti-Chinese and anti-Tungan front in Xinjiang, all of the Turkic peoples should be called "Turks", not only Uyghurs. Sabit Damulla was also behind a creation of Independent Government in Khotan on March 16, 1933, which he proclaimed together with Emir Muhammad Amin Bughra. Later this Government expanded its authority to Kashgar and Aksu through the "Eastern Turkestan Independence Association" and contributed to the proclamation of a republic in the Old City of Kashgar on November 12, 1933. Khoja Niyaz Khaji, the leader of Kumul Rebellion in 1931, was invited by Sabit Damulla to Kashgar to assume presidency of the self- proclaimed Republic.

Death
Contemporary sources say that Abdulbaki was captured by Khoja Niyaz near Aksu in late April 1934, then delivered to Governor Sheng Shicai.
He was executed reportedly by hanging in June 1934 in Urumqi. Previously, in early April 1934, being in his native village of Artush Sabit Damulla rejected several urgent offers from Ma Zhongying to return to Kashgar and form a military alliance against advancing common enemies: Soviet backed Governor Sheng Shicai and Khoja Niyaz. Later sources allege that he was imprisoned by Sheng in Urumchi, where he traded his translation skills for better conditions in his cell. Fellow Chinese Muslims such as Kuomintang officer Liu Bin-Di provided him with the Quran and other Arabic and Chinese Islamic texts to be translated into Uyghur (The establishment of Islam in China in 650 stemmed from the delivery of a Quran by Caliph Usman to Tang Emperor Gaozong in 650 through Envoy Sa'ad ibn Abi Waqqas, one of Muhammad's first companions). Liu had been dispatched from Urumchi to pacify the Hi (Ili) region in 1944, but he was too late. It is unknown if this job was finished, Liu Bin-Di himself was shot dead by rebels in Ghulja in November 1944 during revolt, that led to the establishment of Second East Turkestan Republic on November 12, 1944.

Legacy 
The designated terrorist organization Turkistan Islamic Party's magazine "Islamic Turkistan" Arabic: (تركستان الإسلامية) Uyghur: (ئىسلامى تۈركىستان) Issue #12 included a photo of the founders of the First East Turkestan Republic including Sabit Damulla Abdulbaki which was titled "Men who marked history in their blood" (رجال سطروا التاريخ بدمائهم) (1933–1352) featuring the caption "Founders of an independent islamic state in the Hijri year 1352 in East Turkestan" (مؤسسوا دولة إسلامية مستقلة عام 1352هـ في تركستان الشرقية).

Al-Qaeda ideologue Mustafa Setmariam Nasar praised the formation of the 1933 "Republic of East Turkestan" by Damulla, leader of Islamists.

The Turkistan Islamic Party mentioned the First East Turkestan Republic and Sabit Damulla (ثابت داملا) in issue 19 of its magazine "Islamic Turkistan".

See also
Islamic Republic of East Turkestan
Khoja Niyaz

References 

 Mark Dickens  "The Soviets in Sinkiang (1911-1949)". USA 1990.
 Michael Zrazhevsky "Russian Cossacks in Sinkiang". Almanach "Third Rome", Russia, Moscow, 2001

1883 births
1934 deaths
Jadids
Executed people from Xinjiang
Uyghurs
Pan-Turkists
East Turkestan independence activists
Executed Republic of China people
People executed by the Republic of China by hanging
Executed Chinese people
People from Kizilsu